Péter Janesch (born 7 November 1953 in Budapest) is a Hungarian architect.

Life
In 1973, Janesch studied interior design at the Hungarian School of Applied Arts under Gyorgy Nanossy, Peter Reimholz, György Szrogh and Ferenc Vamossy. In 1982, he began as a student at the Hungarian School of Building. He eventually became a lecturer there and at the School of Applied Arts. He became a master of teaching architecture and traveled to Japan in 1990 to research this field. He also curated the Hungarian pavilion at the 2004 Venice Biennale.

Works
 First prize for Budapest government district plan with the firm miniplus architects. (2007)

References

Hungarian architects
Living people
1953 births